Saal Greenstein syndrome is a very rare autosomal recessive genetic disorder characterized by stunted growth, short limbs, microcephaly, and an anomalous cleavage of the anterior chamber of the eye. The disorder is similar to Robinow syndrome except for anterior chamber anomalies and, in one case, hydrocephalus.

References

External links 

Genetic diseases and disorders
Rare diseases
Syndromes
Diseases named for discoverer